KGJN-LP (106.7 FM "Traffic Weather Information") is a low-power FM radio station broadcasting a news talk information format. As of June 2010, the station was rebroadcasting the local NOAA weather radio station. That station is known as WXM55, which originates on a frequency of 162.550 MHz. This broadcast includes local and regional weather forecasts. Licensed to Grand Junction, Colorado, United States, the station is currently owned by State of Colorado Telecom Services.

References

External links
 

GJN-LP
GJN-LP
News and talk radio stations in the United States